The Glen M. and Roxie Walbeck House, at 12875 S. Boulter St. in Draper, Utah, was built during c.1935–1952  It was listed on the National Register of Historic Places in 2006.

The house is historically significant for its association with the poultry industry in Draper.  It was home of Glen M. Walbeck, who was a coal miner and a professional baseball player, and his wife Roxie.  The home had chicken coops in the back.

References

Houses on the National Register of Historic Places in Utah
Houses completed in 1952
Houses in Salt Lake County, Utah
Ranch house architecture
National Register of Historic Places in Salt Lake County, Utah
Buildings and structures in Draper, Utah